The Kansas Barbed Wire Museum is a barbed wire museum located in La Crosse, Kansas, United States, known as the “Barbed Wire Capital of the World.” The museum focuses on barbed wire and its history, displaying over 2,000 different forms of the wire and its history. Barbed wire played a significant role in the history of the settlement of the United States and forever changed the face of the prairie.

The museum was established in 1970 in a small storefront on Main Street in downtown La Crosse, Kansas. By 1990, the collections had grown so much that a new building was constructed adjacent to the Post Rock Museum and Rush County Historical Museum in Grass Park at the south edge of the community. In 2004, an addition was constructed on the building to house the headquarters of the Antique Barbed Wire Society and the Larry Greer Research Center. The Antique Barbed Wire Society is an international organization “committed to collecting, preserving, exhibiting, and interpreting the historical heritage of barb wire and barbed wire related items.” The Larry Greer Research Center houses collections of publications related to the history of barbed wire and a complete collection of patents related to barbed wire and related items. The Kansas Barbed Wire Museum is located at 120 W. 1st Street, La Crosse, KS 67548.

References

Museums in Rush County, Kansas
Rural history museums in Kansas
American West museums